The Canon EF 20 mm 2.8 USM lens is an ultra-wide-angle prime lens produced by Canon for the EF lens mount. It features an ultrasonic motor. On a camera with an APS-C sensor the focal length is equivalent to 32 mm, and it is classified as a wide-lens. It features a ring-type USM motor featuring full-time manual and a fixed front element. The optical scheme of the lens includes eleven element in nine groups without any special lens. The performances are considered good, but not enough to compete with modern prime lenses; some zoom lenses from the Canon L series offer similar performances.

References

External links 

 EF20mm f/2.8 USM - Canon museum

Products introduced in 1992
20 mm lens